Galium magnifolium (largeleaf bedstraw) is a species of plants in the Rubiaceae. It is native to California (Inyo Co), Arizona (Coconino Co), Nevada (Clark + Lincoln Cos), and Utah (Washington + San Juan Cos).

References

External links
Gardening Europe

magnifolium
Flora of Arizona
Flora of Utah
Flora of California
Flora of Nevada
Plants described in 1934
Flora without expected TNC conservation status